Real del Padre is a town and district in San Rafael Department, Mendoza Province, Argentina, located to the east of San Rafael city, just in the border to General Alvear Department.

The town has a population about 6.000 inhabits.

Agricultural areas with fruit trees, vineyards and wineries are the main activities.

A big factory of tinned fruits is established in the town.

External links

 San Rafael government (Spanish)
 https://www.facebook.com/RealDelPadreAcervoFotograficoBiodiversidadYCultura

Populated places in Mendoza Province